Henry Yiadom Boakye (born Monday 12 May 1969) is a Ghanaian politician who currently serves as the Member of Parliament for the Akwatia Constituency.

Early life and education 
Henry Yiadom Boakye was born and hails from Akwatia in the Eastern Region of Ghana. Henry Yiadom Boakye obtained his Diploma in Engineering in the year 1989.

Career 
Henry Yiadom Boakye is the Founder and chief executive officer of Okoyo Foundation. He is also working now as the Member of Parliament (MP) for Akwatia Constituency in the Eastern Region of Ghana on the ticket of the National Democratic Congress.

Political life 
Henry Yiadom Boakye contested and won the NDC parliamentary primaries for Akwatia Constituency in the Eastern Region of Ghana. Henry Yiadom Boakye won again in the 2020 Ghanaian general elections on the ticket of the National Democratic Congress with 19,899 votes (51.5%) to join the Eighth (8th) Parliament of the Fourth Republic of Ghana against Ernest Kumi of the New Patriotic Party who had 18,742 votes (48.5).

Committees 
Henry Yiadom Boakye is a member of the Youth, Sports and Culture Committee. He is also a member of the Privileges Committee of the Eighth (8th) Parliament of the Fourth Republic of Ghana.

Personal life 
Henry Yiadom Boakye is a Christian.

References 

Living people
1974 births
National Democratic Congress (Ghana) politicians
Ghanaian MPs 2021–2025